Caladenia bicalliata subsp. bicalliata, commonly known as the limestone spider orchid or dwarf limestone spider orchid, is a plant in the orchid family Orchidaceae and is native to the south-west of Western Australia and coastal areas of South Australia. It has a single erect, hairy leaf and one or two cream-coloured flowers with reddish-brown tips.

Description
Caladenia bicalliata subsp. bicalliata is a terrestrial, perennial, deciduous, herb with an underground tuber and which occurs singly or in small clumps. The lateral sepals and petals are cream or greenish-cream, much shorter than those of the similar C. abbreviata and C. evanescens and have reddish-brown tips. The edge of the labellum is serrated and there are two rows of white-tipped calli along its centre. Flowering occurs from August to early October, however the flowers are often open for only one or two days and sometimes self-pollinate and do not open at all.

Taxonomy and naming
Caladenia bicalliata was first formally described by Richard Rogers in 1909 but in 2001 Stephen Hopper and Andrew Brown described two subspecies, including subspecies bicalliata and the description of the two subspecies was published in Nuytsia The specific epithet (bicalliata) is a derived from the Latin bi- meaning "two", callus meaning "a callus" and -atus indicating possession, referring to the two pairs of rows of calli on the labellum.

Distribution and habitat

Conservation
Caladenia bicalliata subsp. bicalliata  is classified as "not threatened" by the Western Australian Government Department of Parks and Wildlife.

References

bicalliata subsp. bicalliata
Endemic orchids of Australia
Orchids of South Australia
Orchids of Western Australia
Plants described in 1909
Taxa named by Stephen Hopper